Atatürk Cultural Center is a building complex for cultural events in Mersin, Turkey. Its full name is "Yenişehir Municipaty Atatürk Cultural Center". Yenişehir is a central municipality in Mersin. Together with Mersin Halkevi and Mersin Congress and Exhibition Center this complex is used for the cultural activities in Mersin.

Geography

History
In 2012, the Yenişehir mayor İbrahim Genç gave the approximate construction period as 1.5 years. The center was opened in October 2014.

The building
The total area of the complex is  including 300-car-capacity parking lot. There are three halls; a 1500-sitting-capacity big hall, a 500-sitting-capacity ballet hall and a 500-sitting-capacity conference center. The big hall is equipped with an orchestra pit and a  ceiling tower. There are also smaller halls of  25-150 sitting capacity as well as various facilities such as restaurants, dressing rooms etc.

References

Buildings and structures in Mersin
Culture in Mersin
Yenişehir, Mersin
Architecture in Turkey
Things named after Mustafa Kemal Atatürk